is a 1997 Japanese mystery film directed by Gakuryū Ishii. It was screened in the Contemporary World Cinema section of the 1997 Toronto International Film Festival. The movie is based on a novel by Kyuusaku Yumeno.

Cast
 Rena Komine as Tomiko Tomonari
 Tadanobu Asano as Tatsuo Niitaka
 Kotomi Kyôno as Chieko Yamashita
 Tomoka Kurotani as Tsuyako Tukikawa
 Kirina Mano as Aiko
 Shūko Honami
 Reiko Matsuo as Mineko Matsuura

References

External links
 

1997 films
1990s mystery films
Japanese mystery films
1990s Japanese-language films
Japanese black-and-white films
Films directed by Sōgo Ishii
1990s Japanese films